Estádio Municipal Felipe Raulino, known as Felipão, is a multi-use stadium in Altos, Piauí, Brazil. It is used mostly for football matches, and has a maximum capacity of 4,000 people.

Their record attendance match occurred on 7 February 2018, in a Copa do Brasil home win for Altos over Atlético Goianiense.

References

Football venues in Piauí
Associação Atlética de Altos
Sports venues in Piauí